Hwang Youn-joo (born 13 August 1986) is a South Korean volleyball player.

She was part of the silver medal winning team at the 2010 Asian Games. She was also part of the South Korea women's national volleyball team at the 2010 FIVB Volleyball Women's World Championship, and 2011 FIVB Volleyball Women's World Cup. She participated in the 2012 Summer Olympics, when the South Korean team finished 4th after losing the bronze medal match 0-3 to Japan, and the 2016 Summer Olympics, when they finished 5th.

At club level, she has played for Suwon Hyundai Engineering & Construction Hillstate since 2010. Prior to that, she had been with Incheon Heungkuk Life Pink Spiders since 2005, who were initially based in Cheonan.

Early life and education
The oldest child in a family with a brother and a sister, Yeonju first received her education at Sosa Elementary School in her hometown of Bucheon, Wongok Middle School in Ansan, and Hanil Jeonsan High School in Suwon, now known as Hanbom High School. Upon graduation from high school in 2005, she was selected as the second pick in the first-round draft by the Heungkuk Life team.

Later on, Yeonju also studied at the Department of Sports Management in Kyonggi University.

References

1986 births
Living people
South Korean women's volleyball players
Asian Games medalists in volleyball
Volleyball players at the 2006 Asian Games
Volleyball players at the 2010 Asian Games
Volleyball players at the 2012 Summer Olympics
Olympic volleyball players of South Korea
Volleyball players at the 2016 Summer Olympics
Medalists at the 2010 Asian Games
Asian Games silver medalists for South Korea
People from Bucheon
Sportspeople from Gyeonggi Province
20th-century South Korean women
21st-century South Korean women